The standard entry-to-practice degree in modern evidence-based medicine in India is the Bachelor of Medicine and Bachelor of Surgery (MBBS). Alternative systems of Medicine in India are Ayurveda (BAMS), Unani (BUMS), Siddha(BSMS), Homeopathy (BHMS).  
M.B.B.S. (Bachelor of Medicine and Bachelor of Surgery) a credential earned upon completion of a five-and-a-half-year undergraduate program. The curriculum is divided into one year of preclinical studies in general science subjects and three and a half years of paraclinical and clinical studies, followed by a one-year clinical internship. Before beginning the internship, students are required to pass several examinations, the final one of which is conducted in two parts. Postgraduate education in medical specialties typically takes 3 additional years of study after the MBBS and concludes with the award of a Master of Surgery or Doctor of Medicine(MD). Postgraduate diplomas in medical specialities may also be awarded upon the completion of two-year training programs.

India has various ancient systems of medicine that long predate the introduction of modern Western medicine during British colonial rule. Ancient Indian system of medicine is referred to as Ayurveda (Science of life).
All traditional systems like Ayurveda, Yoga, Naturopathy, Unani, Siddha, and Homeopathy (collectively referred to as AYUSH) are common forms of medical care in India, especially in rural regions. While these forms of medicine also play a major role in India's public health care system along with modern system of medicine and are often practiced informally, practitioners are officially mandated to be licensed by one of the country's 29 state medical councils. Professional degree programs in traditional systems are structured similarly: Credentials like the Bachelor of Ayurveda, Medicine and Surgery (BAMS), the Bachelor of Homeopathic Medicine and Surgery (BHMS) are awarded upon the completion of five-and-a-half-year undergraduate programs. Graduation typically requires passing annual examinations and completing a final one-year clinical internship. Graduate education in medical specialties typically takes three additional year of studies After BAMS And BHMS And conclude with Award of Master of Ayurveda (BAMS MD/MS (AYU)) And Master of Homeopathy (BHMS MD(HOMEO)). In BAMS
Postgraduate diplomas in medical specializations may also be awarded upon the completion of two-year training programs.

. In terms of oversight, Ayush system of medical Education regulated by a separate ministry 
CCIM (Central Council Of Indian Medicine) and CCH (Central Council of Homeopathy. Modern system of medicine  MCI (Medical Council of India) or the new National Medical Commission.

Colleges and University 

In India, a medical college is an educational institution that provides medical education. These institutions may vary from stand-alone colleges that train doctors to conglomerates that offer training related in all aspects of medical care. The term is synonymous with "medical school" as used in the US and some other countries. MBBS is a degree in Modern Scientific Medicine established by Indian Medical Council Act 1956 and continued in National Medical Commission Act 2019. After MBBS, they register with state medical councils . Indian law requires these institutions to be recognized by the Medical Council of India. The Indian government keeps an updated list of these approved medical colleges. Many Persons without MBBS degrees practice like doctors in India. They are called quacks. According to National Medical Commission Act 2019, punishment for quackery has been enhanced to up to 1 year imprisonment and up to Rs. 5 lakh fine.

Admissions 
Admissions to courses in Medical Colleges of India have been streamlined in the last few years. There criteria vary from one country to other. For example, applicants should be undergraduates when they apply to American universities while they pursue bachelor's degrees when they apply to China medical colleges. The whole admission process is under a major reform with ongoing court cases from parties against it. In general, admission was based on one of the following:

 Marks obtained in the competitive examinations conducted at central level (NEET)
 Minimum 50%(for general category) Marks obtained in PCB (P stands for physics, C stands for chemistry and B stands for biology) in the final examinations of Std. XII.
 Donation/Management based seats.

Similarly for Post-graduate degrees and diplomas (residencies) the competitive examinations conducted at central (NEET) level forms the basis for admission or donation based seats. Specific institutions may also require a personal interview of the candidate but this is more in cases of sub-specialty courses.

These donation based seats have come under heavy criticism because this makes effectively India the only country that authorises, as official policy, the sale of medical seats by private medical colleges, implicitly accepting the principle that the ability to pay, and not merit, is what counts. These illegal capitation fees range from Rs.50 lakh to Rs.1 crore for a MBBS seat. For any medical seat a student from general category should minimum have scored 50 percentile in NEET UG to get seat in UG courses. But medical colleges in states like Kerala, require minimum marks / ranks in their respective competitive entrance exams even for the management seats.

In order to reduce stress of multiple examinations and ensuring minimum competence and importantly with the purpose to weed out corruption in medical education across the country NTA-NEET-UG and NEET-PG were first proposed in the Vision 2015 by Board of Governors (BOGs) appointed after by Government of India after dissolution of MCI.NEET examination is a single window for entry into a medical college. Although specifics of implemented NEET for UG and PG courses are different from what was proposed in Vision 2015 document, it has essentially maintained its core purpose.

Entrance examinations were conducted by the following agencies and abolished in 2019:
 AIIMS Entrance Exams – All India Institute of Medical Science
 NEET (National Eligibility cum Entrance Test) - National Testing Agency(NTA)
 JIPMER Entrance Exams – Jawaharlal Institute of Post-graduate Medical Education and Research

Undergraduate Admission 
NTA-NEET (Undergraduate), for MBBS and BDS courses, was conducted in 2013 by the Central Board of Secondary Education (CBSE). NEET-UG replaced the All India Pre Medical Test (AIPMT) and all individual MBBS exams conducted by states or colleges themselves. However, many colleges and institutes took a stay order and conducted private examinations for admission to their MBBS and BDS courses. Nevertheless, many other reputed institutes such as the Armed Forces Medical College and Banaras Hindu University have opted to admit students on the basis of the NEET-UG. The first exam was held on 5 May 2013, and the results were announced on 5 June 2013. In India, there is a huge competition to qualify for an MBBS seat. In NEET-UG 2013, among the registered candidates, a total of 7,17,127 candidates were eligible to appear in the NEET-UG, 2013, out of which 6,58,040 candidates appeared in the test and 3,66,317 candidates qualified the test for 31,000 seats. This makes a 4.71% appearing the exam to securing a seat success rate.

On 18 July 2013 the Indian Supreme Court struck down the NEET exam with a 2:1 decision. The Medical Council of India has appealed for a review in August 2013, in may of 2016 supreme court of India cancelled all medical exams and NEET (UG) and NEET (PG) becomes an only way to get admission in almost all medical colleges of India. From 2019 NEET Examinations are conducted by the National Testing Agency (NTA).

Postgraduate Admission 
Similarly for Post graduation courses (residencies), the NBE NEET (PG) is the single eligibility cum entrance examination for MD/MS and post-graduate diploma courses. This effectively replaced the existing AIPGMEE and similar state level exams for entry into post-graduate courses. The first NEET (PG) was conducted by the National Board of Examinations from 23 November – 6 December 2012, which was referred to as the testing window (with 24th, 25th, 28 November and 2 December as non-testing days). The test was a computer-based test unlike the traditional paper and pen based test AIIMS had been conducting over years for admission to 50% all India quota Post graduate courses in the country. In all, 90,377 candidates took the exam.

Admission for Foreign nationals 
Apart from non-resident Indian and person of Indian origin (NRI) quotas in different government as well as private colleges, Government of India has also allocated a number of seats for students from developing countries where facilities for medical education are either inadequate. The exact number and country-based allocation of these reserved seats may vary annually.

Students seeking admission to the reserved seats are required to apply through the Indian missions abroad or through the diplomatic missions of the respective countries in India. The Indian Embassy or High Commission in a country will be able to provide more information on request. The requirement for an entrance is usually waived for such sponsored candidates.

Its important to note that foreign nationals wishing to take seats through NRI quota should still qualify through NEET (at least for all government colleges) and seats will be allotted on merit in that quota from all the NRI candidates eligible. The fee structure for NRI candidates is also different.

Undergraduate Education

MBBS 
A medical college offers graduate degree Bachelor of Medicine and Bachelor of Surgery (MBBS).  Only institutions offering MBBS course in its curriculum are referred to as a Medical Colleges. The college may teach Post Graduate as well as Paramedical courses. The admission to government MBBS programs is highly competitive.

The MBBS course starts with the basic pre and para-clinical subjects such as biochemistry, physiology, anatomy, microbiology, pathology and pharmacology. The students simultaneously obtain hands-on training in the wards and out-patient departments, where they interact with real patients for five long years. The curriculum aims to inculcate standard protocols of history taking, examination, differential diagnosis and Complete patient Management. The student is taught to determine what investigations will be useful for a patient and what are the best treatment options. The curriculum also contains a thorough practical knowledge and practice of performing standard clinical procedures. The course also contains a 12-month-long internship, in which an intern is rotated across various specialties. Besides standard clinical care, one also gets a thorough experience of ward management, staff management and thorough counselling skills.

The degree awarded is "Bachelor of Medicine and Bachelor of Surgery". The minimum requirements for the MBBS course are 50% marks in physics, chemistry, biology and English in the '10+2' examinations. For reserved category students the requirement is 40%. MBBS admissions are not centralised. The admission requirements differ across universities. Generally, students who attain higher marks in the qualifying examinations and in the Medical Entrance examinations conducted by various agencies are accepted onto the MBBS course.

I (First) MBBS 
The pre-clinical course consists of Anatomy, Physiology and Biochemistry, and these are the basic subjects of medical students and it lasts for a year. Prior to 1997 the I MBBS consisted of 1½ years, but this was trimmed to make more time available for clinical exposure. Passing the I MBBS final examination is mandatory to proceed with the course. A candidate failing the first MBBS examination is detained until all the 1st MBBS subjects are cleared. However the MCI has changed this in regulations on graduate medical education 2012. In many universities if one does not clear a subject that student will get into an intermediate batch. It is a severe drawback.  Morning session usually consist of an Anatomy lecture followed by dissection, except for one day when a class in biostatistics may be taken. Afternoon sessions consist of a theory class followed by laboratory work in Physiology or Biochemistry or it may be histology branch of anatomy.

II (Second) MBBS 
Pathology, Pharmacology, Microbiology, and Forensic Medicine for one and half years. After clearing all the four subjects a student advances to III MBBS. The lecture classes and lab work of these subjects are usually held in the afternoons to enable students to attend the clinical wards and out patient departments in the mornings. These are followed by Short postings (15days duration) in Pediatrics, Psychiatry, Forensic medicine, Skin & Leprosy,& Respiratory medicine & TB. This may be followed directly by major postings or a clinical posting in Community Medicine may intervene.

III (Final) MBBS – Part I 
Part I consists of one year, where Social and Preventive Medicine (Community Medicine), Ear Nose and Throat and Ophthalmology form the core subjects.

III (Final) MBBS – Part II 
One year of focused training in the four basic clinical subjects, namely: Medicine, Surgery (incl. Orthopaedics), Paediatrics, Obstetrics & Gynaecology. On passing the final MBBS examination, a candidate is awarded provisional registration by the MCI or the State medical council and can start the internship. Permanent registration (license to practice) and the final Medical degree (i.e., MBBS) is given only after successful and satisfactory completion of the Compulsory Rotating Medical Internship.

Internship 
After successful completion of the MBBS course, one has to compulsorily work in the hospital attached to the medical college or in any other approved hospital allowed in some medical colleges, for a period of one year. This posting is called the Compulsory Rotating Medical Internship or the House Surgeon in Kerala/Tamil Nadu. The student gets the degree only after satisfactory completion of their internship. Interns are posted in all clinical departments of the hospital on a rotation basis, receiving basic clinical and practical knowledge about all the disciplines of medicine to make the medical graduate fit to work in the community as a General Physician. The schedules of an intern is usually extremely exhaustive. For example, one may have to work for the whole night and then have to start the next day duty only after about one or two hours. This may last till the afternoon. 24-hour sleepless duty at a stretch is not uncommon and sometimes the scheduled breaks are also not allowed by the superiors. The intern is also paid a monthly stipend for work at the hospital, which differs in different medical colleges on the basis of the management. The person is licensed to practice medicine only after completion of this internship. And only after finishing internship, one can receive his MBBS degree and can pursue postgraduate studies.

Post-internship, some graduates may choose to work in different medical specialities and are often referred to as House Officers or House Physicians or House Surgeons. This is different from postgraduate training and does not lead to award of a degree. A doctor undergoing higher speciality training is referred to as a "post-graduate trainee" or simply a PGT. House Physicians, PGTs and interns are also called junior doctors across Indian hospitals. PGTs and House Officers are sometimes referred to as Junior Residents. After completion of postgraduate work, doctors may enter subspeciality training and are then known as "post-doctoral trainees" or simply PDTs. They are also called as senior residents at some institutes.

Residency 
The Internship is different from House Officership (which may follow Internship), as understood in UK and other countries. The latter is not a compulsory tenure. The House Physician or House Surgeon, unlike an Intern, works in a particular department of his or her choice and is paid a monthly 'salary' for his work in the hospital (especially, in the UK). The American counterpart is simply called a "Resident" (i.e., a Resident Physician or a Resident Surgeon). The entire period of residency in India can be very demanding, both physically and psychologically. The Maharashtra Association of Resident Doctors (Mard) had filed a complaint with the Maharashtra Human Rights Commission (MHRC) regarding resident doctors being made to work for more than 30 hours at a stretch. There have been instances of doctor suicides due to stress and burnout. Institutions have been criticised for lack of hygienic food supply to resident doctors and their shabby living conditions.

Alternative Medicine
Ayurveda, Yoga & Naturopathy, Unani, Siddha Homeopathy are collectively called as AYUSH – Alternative medicine.

 B.A.M.S., Bachelor of Ayurvedic Medicine and Surgery followed by M.D.
 B.H.M.S., Bachelor of Homeopathic Medicine & Surgery followed by M.D.
 B.N.Y.S., Bachelor of Naturopathy & Yogic Sciences followed by M.D.
 B.S.M.S., Bachelor of Siddha Medicine and Surgery followed by M.D.
 B.U.M.S., Bachelor of Unani Medine and Surgery followed by M.D.

Other Undergraduate courses
 BSc in Nursing
 BSc in  Medical Lab Technology
 BSc in Speech Therapy
 BSc in Neurology
 B.P.T (Physiotherapy)
 [B.O.T] (Occupational Therapy)
 B.D.S,  (Dental Surgery)

Pharma
 B.Pharm

Postgraduate Education 

All the major colleges also have Postgraduate Degree or Diploma courses in their programmes. The awards conferred are Doctor of Medicine (MD), Doctor of philosophy (Ph.D Medical) Master of Surgery (MS) Master of Science (M.Sc Medical), Doctor of Medicine/Master of Surgery (D.SM) dual degree or Diplomate of National Board (DNB). The MD/MS degrees are offered by the universities affiliated to the Medical Council of India and the DNB degree is awarded by the National Board of Examinations, an independent autonomous body under the Ministry of Health, India. They are available in different streams of medical science such as General medicine, General surgery, Orthopaedics, Radiodiagnosis, Radiotherapy, ENT, Obstetrics and gynaecology, Ophthalmology, Anaesthesia, Paediatrics, Community medicine, Pathology, Microbiology, Forensic medicine, Pharmacology, Anatomy, Physiology etc. Degree courses are of 3 years duration while diploma courses are of 2 years duration. Following post-graduation, students can opt for further super-specialization in their area of interest by opting for courses called DM or DNB (Doctorate of Medicine), or MCh or DNB (Master of Chirurgery/Surgery) again of three years duration.

An MD or a DNB (general medicine or paediatrics) is the basic requirement for specialisation in Cardiology, Nephrology, Neonatology, Gastro-enterology, Neurology except for Clinical Hematology (Pathology or general medicine), etc., while an MS or a DNB (general surgery, ENT or Orthopaedic surgery) is the basic requirement for Neurosurgery, Urology, Cardio-thoracic & Vascular Surgery, Gastrointestinal Surgery, Paediatric Surgery, Plastic Surgery, etc.

Family medicine has now become an area of priority in India, and many teaching hospitals offer DNB (Family Medicine).

Doctoral and Post Doctorate 

Post-doctoral fellowship courses in Neuro-radiology, Neuro or Cardiac anesthesiology, etc. are offered by select institutions.

Doctoral/Fellowship 

 Doctor of Philosophy (PhD)
 Pharm D, Doctor of Pharmacy

Post Doctorate 

 Postdoctoral researcher
 Post-doctoral degree

Research

Brain Drain 

India has been one of the most important source country of medical doctors for the advanced countries since the 1960s. An estimated total of 20,315 emigrated Indian physicians and 22,786 Indian nurses were working in the OECD countries in the year 2000. With 59,523 physicians of Indian origin working in the English speaking Western world (the US, UK, Australia and Canada combined) in 2004, India had become by far the single largest source of emigrated physicians in the world.

See also
 Education in India
 List of Indian inventions and discoveries

References

External links 

 National Board of Examinations

 
Medical education in India